The 1918–19 Minnesota Golden Gophers men's basketball team represented the University of Minnesota in intercollegiate basketball during the 1918–19 season. The team finished the season with a 13–0 record and were named national champions by the Helms Athletic Foundation. Guard Erling Platou was named the national player of the year, becoming the University of Minnesota's first (and through the 2013–14 season, only) national player of the year award winner.

Starters
Source
 Arnold Oss – Forward
 Miles Lawler – Forward
 Norman Kingsley – Center
 Joel Hultkrans – Guard
 Erling Platou – Guard

Schedule

|-
! colspan="9" style="text-align: center; background:#800000"|Regular season

Source

References

Minnesota Golden Gophers men's basketball seasons
Minnesota
NCAA Division I men's basketball tournament championship seasons
Minnesota Golden Gophers Men's Basketball Team
Minnesota Golden Gophers Men's Basketball Team